The Philippine National Construction Corporation (PNCC) is a government-owned and controlled corporation (GOCC) in the Philippines. It is the largest construction company in the Philippines and in Southeast Asia.

It is usually tasked with major construction works, especially in the field of infrastructure.  The PNCC has extensive operations in the Philippines, and has also been involved in projects and has or had operations in various other countries, notably in Saudi Arabia, Iraq, Hong Kong, Malaysia, and Indonesia.

History
The PNCC was established in 1966 by virtue of an executive order during the administration of the Former President Ferdinand Marcos as the Construction and Development Corporation of the Philippines (CDCP), with the corporation being led by Rodolfo Cuenca, a crony.  It was granted a 50-year franchise to commission and perform construction works throughout the Philippines.

In 1977, Presidential Decree No. 1113 was issued, granting the CDCP a 30-year franchise to operate and maintain the various limited-access toll highways in the Philippines.  The CDCP changed its name to its present name in 1983 after the infusion of additional equity from the government since 1981. The PNCC is now under the full supervision of the Office of the Secretary of the Department of Trade and Industry by virtue of the Executive Order 331, issued last July 16, 2004.

Projects
The PNCC has been involved in various projects over the years. Some of its most famous projects were the San Juanico Bridge, the Metro Manila Skyway, North and South Luzon Expressways, the Manila Light Rail Transit System, the Manila–Cavite Expressway and Bay City.

Ownership
Government of the Philippines: 49%
Government Service Insurance System: 29.35%
Universal Holdings Corporation: 15.32%
Others (includes public stock): 6.33%

Subsidiaries
PNCC is divided into the following subsidiaries:
  Dasmariñas Industrial and Steelworks Corporation
  Traffic Control Products Corporation
 South Metro Manila Skyway Project
 Manila North Tollways Corporation
 South Luzon Tollway Corporation

References

External links
Philippine National Construction Corporation Website
Department of Trade and Industry

Construction and civil engineering companies of the Philippines
Companies based in Parañaque
Government-owned and controlled corporations of the Philippines
Department of Trade and Industry (Philippines)
Companies listed on the Philippine Stock Exchange
Construction and civil engineering companies established in 1966
Philippine companies established in 1966
Establishments by Philippine executive order